Mahnoosh Motamedi Azari is an Iranian engineer and conservative politician. She served as a Tehran councilor from 2003 to 2007 and is a lecturer at K. N. Toosi University of Technology.

References

 Biography 
 Academic webpage

1957 births
Living people
Tehran Councillors 2003–2007
Front of Islamic Revolution Stability politicians
Alliance of Builders of Islamic Iran politicians
Alumni of the University of North London
Alumni of Middlesex University
Academic staff of K. N. Toosi University of Technology